James Garner (born James Scott Bumgarner; April 7, 1928 – July 19, 2014) was an American actor. He played leading roles in more than 50 theatrical films, including The Great Escape (1963) with Steve McQueen; Paddy Chayefsky's The Americanization of Emily (1964) with Julie Andrews; Cash McCall (1960) with Natalie Wood; The Wheeler Dealers (1963) with Lee Remick; Darby's Rangers (1958) with Stuart Whitman; Roald Dahl's 36 Hours (1965) with Eva Marie Saint; Raymond Chandler's Marlowe (1969) with Bruce Lee; Support Your Local Sheriff! (1969) with Walter Brennan; Blake Edwards's Victor/Victoria (1982) with Julie Andrews; and Murphy's Romance (1985) with Sally Field, for which he received an Academy Award nomination. He also starred in several television series, including popular roles such as Bret Maverick in the ABC 1950s Western series Maverick and as Jim Rockford in the NBC 1970s private detective show, The Rockford Files. 

Garner's career and popularity continued into the 21st century with films such as Space Cowboys (2000) with Clint Eastwood; the animated film Atlantis: The Lost Empire (2001) (voice work) with Michael J. Fox and Cree Summer; The Notebook (2004) with Gena Rowlands and Ryan Gosling; and in his TV sitcom role as Jim Egan in 8 Simple Rules (2003–2005).

Early life
Garner was born James Scott Bumgarner in 1928 in Denver, Oklahoma (now under Lake Thunderbird near Norman). His parents were German Americans, Weldon Warren Bumgarner, a widower, and Mildred Scott (Meek), who died five years after his birth. His mother was half Cherokee. His older brothers were Jack Garner, also an actor, and Charles Bumgarner, a school administrator. His family was Methodist. After their mother's death, Garner and his brothers were sent to live with relatives. Garner was reunited with his family in 1934, when Weldon remarried.

Garner's father remarried several times. Garner had a volatile relationship with one of his stepmothers, Wilma, who beat all three boys. He said that his stepmother also punished him by forcing him to wear a dress in public. When he was 14 years old, he fought with her, knocking her down and choking her to keep her from retaliating against him physically. She left the family and never returned. His brother Jack later commented, "She was a damn no-good woman". Garner's last stepmother was Grace, whom he said he loved and called "Mama Grace", and he felt that she was more of a mother to him than anyone else had been.

Shortly after Garner's father's marriage to Wilma broke up, his father moved to Los Angeles, leaving Garner and his brothers in Norman.  After working at several jobs he disliked, Garner joined the United States Merchant Marine at age 16 near the end of World War II. He liked the work and his shipmates, but he had chronic seasickness.

After World War II, Garner joined his father in Los Angeles and was enrolled at Hollywood High School, where he was voted the most popular student.  A high school gym teacher recommended him for a job modeling Jantzen bathing suits. It paid well ($25 an hour) but, in his first interview for the Archives of American Television, he said he hated modeling. He soon quit and returned to Norman.

There he played football and basketball at Norman High School and competed on the track and golf teams. However, he dropped out in his senior year. In a 1976 Good Housekeeping magazine interview, he admitted, "I was a terrible student and I never actually graduated from high school, but I got my diploma in the Army."

Military service

Garner enlisted in the California Army National Guard, serving his first 7 months in California. Then, during the Korean War, he went to Korea for 14 months as a rifleman in the 5th Regimental Combat Team, then part of the 24th Infantry Division. He was wounded twice: first in the face and hand by shrapnel from a mortar round, and second in the buttocks from friendly fire from U.S. fighter jets as he dove into a foxhole.

Garner received the Purple Heart in Korea for the first wound. He qualified for a second Purple Heart (eligibility requirement: "As the result of friendly fire while actively engaging the enemy"), but he did not actually receive it until 1983, 32 years after the event.

Awards

Career

Earliest acting roles

In 1954, Paul Gregory, a friend whom Garner had met while attending Hollywood High School, persuaded Garner to take a nonspeaking role in the Broadway production of The Caine Mutiny Court-Martial, where he was able to study Henry Fonda night after night. During the week of Garner's death in 2014, TCM broadcast several of his movies, introduced by Robert Osborne, who said that Fonda's gentle, sincere persona rubbed off on Garner, greatly to Garner's benefit.

Garner subsequently moved to television commercials and eventually to television roles. In 1955, Garner was considered for the lead role in the Western series Cheyenne, but that role went to Clint Walker because the casting director could not reach Garner in time (according to Garner's autobiography). Garner wound up playing an Army officer in the 1955 Cheyenne pilot titled "Mountain Fortress." His first film appearances were in The Girl He Left Behind and Toward the Unknown in 1956. Also in 1956, Garner appeared with Ralph Bellamy and Gloria Talbott in a half-hour television episode of Dick Powell's Zane Grey Theatre titled "Star Over Texas" in which a rivalry exists between Bellamy and Garner over Talbott until they're attacked by a tribe of rampaging Native Americans.

In 1957, he had a supporting role in the TV anthology series episode on Conflict entitled "Man from 1997," portraying Maureen's brother "Red"; the show stars Jacques Sernas as Johnny Vlakos, Gloria Talbott as Maureen, and Charlie Ruggles as elderly Mr. Boyne, a time-travelling librarian from 1997, and involved a 1997 Almanac that was mistakenly left in the past by Boyne and found by Johnny in a bookstore. The series' producer Roy Huggins noted in his Archive of American Television interview that he subsequently cast Garner as the lead in Maverick due to his comedic facial expressions while playing scenes in "Man from 1997" that were not originally written to be comical (Huggins knew this because he'd written the episode himself). Garner changed his last name from Bumgarner to Garner after the studio had credited him as "James Garner" without permission. He then legally changed it upon the birth of his first child, when he decided she had too many names.

Maverick (1957–1960)

After several feature film roles, including Sayonara (1957) with Marlon Brando, Garner got his big break playing the role of professional gambler Bret Maverick in the Western series Maverick from 1957 to 1960.

Only Garner and series creator Roy Huggins thought Maverick could compete with The Ed Sullivan Show and The Steve Allen Show but for two years it beat both in the time slot. The show almost immediately made Garner a household name.

Garner was the lone star of Maverick for the first seven episodes but production demands forced the studio, Warner Bros., to create a Maverick brother, Bart Maverick, played by Jack Kelly. This allowed two production units to film different story lines and episodes simultaneously, necessary because each episode took an extra day to complete, meaning that eventually the studio would run out of finished episodes to air partway through the season unless another actor was added.

Critics were positive about the chemistry between Garner and Kelly and the series occasionally featured popular cross-over episodes starring both Maverick brothers as well as numerous brief appearances by Kelly in Garner episodes. This included the famous "Shady Deal at Sunny Acres," upon which the first half of the 1973 movie The Sting appears to be based, according to Roy Huggins' Archive of American Television interview. Garner and guest star Clint Eastwood staged a fistfight in an episode titled "Duel at Sundown", in which Eastwood played a vicious and cowardly gunslinger. Although Garner quit the series after the third season because of a dispute with Warner Bros., he did make one fourth-season Maverick appearance, in an episode titled "The Maverick Line" starring both Garner and Jack Kelly that had been filmed in the third season but held back to run as the season's first episode if Garner lost his lawsuit against Warner Bros. Garner won in court, left the series, and the episode was run in the middle of the season instead.

The studio attempted to replace Garner's character with a Maverick cousin who had lived in Britain long enough to gain an English accent, featuring Roger Moore as Beau Maverick, but Moore left the series after filming only 14 episodes. Warner Bros. had also hired Robert Colbert, a Garner look-alike, to play a third Maverick brother named Brent Maverick. Colbert only appeared in two episodes toward the end of the season. That left the rest of the series' run to Kelly, alternating with reruns of episodes with Garner during the fifth season. Garner still received billing during the opening series credits for these newly produced Kelly episodes, aired in the 1961–1962 season, although he did not appear in them and had left the series two years previously. The studio did, however, reverse the billing, at the beginning of each show and in advertisements during the fifth season, billing Kelly above Garner.

Garner played the lead role in Darby's Rangers (1958). Originally slated for a supporting role, he was given the lead when Charlton Heston turned down the part. He performed well as William Orlando Darby, who was approximately Garner's age during World War II. Following Garner's success in Maverick and Darby's Rangers, Warner Bros. gave Garner two more major theatrical films to be filmed during breaks in his "Maverick" shooting schedule: Up Periscope (1959) with Edmond O'Brien and the romantic drama Cash McCall (1960) with Natalie Wood.

1960s

After his acrimonious departure from Warner Bros. in 1960, Garner briefly found himself graylisted by Warner until director William Wyler hired him for a starring role in The Children's Hour (1961) with Audrey Hepburn and Shirley MacLaine, a drama about two teachers surviving scandal started by a student. After that, the graylist was broken and Garner abruptly became one of the busiest leading men in cinema. In Boys' Night Out (1962) with Kim Novak and Tony Randall and The Thrill of It All (1963) with Doris Day, he returned to comedy. Garner also starred opposite Day in Move Over, Darling, a 1963 remake of 1940's My Favorite Wife in which Garner portrayed the role originally played by Cary Grant. (The remake had begun as Something's Got to Give, but was recast and retitled after Marilyn Monroe died and Dean Martin chose to withdraw as a result.)

Next came the war dramas The Great Escape (1963) with Steve McQueen, Paddy Chayefsky's The Americanization of Emily (1964) with Julie Andrews, and Roald Dahl's 36 Hours (1965) with Eva Marie Saint (all three pictures are set in World War II and both the latter two films involve D-Day). In the smash hit The Great Escape, Garner played the second lead for the only time during the decade, supporting fellow ex-TV series cowboy McQueen among a cast of British and American screen veterans including Richard Attenborough, Donald Pleasence, David McCallum, James Coburn, and Charles Bronson in a story depicting a mass escape from a German prisoner of war camp based on a true story. The film was released in the same month as The Thrill Of It All, giving Garner two hit films at the box office at the same time.
The Americanization of Emily, a literate antiwar D-Day comedy, featured a screenplay written by Paddy Chayefsky and has remained Garner's favorite of all his work. In 1963, exhibitors voted him the 16th most popular star in the US and it was hoped that he might be a successor to Clark Gable.  He also made Mister Buddwing (1966), a picture depicting a man suddenly suffering from amnesia while sitting on a bench in Central Park.

By October 1964, Garner had formed his own independent film production company, Cherokee Productions. He next starred in, and his Cherokee Productions co-produced, Norman Jewison's romantic comedy The Art of Love (1965) with Dick Van Dyke and Elke Sommer. The Westerns Duel at Diablo (1966) with Sidney Poitier and Hour of the Gun (1967) with Garner as Wyatt Earp and Jason Robards Jr. as Doc Holliday followed, as well as the comedy A Man Could Get Killed (1966) with Melina Mercouri and Tony Franciosa. Grand Prix (1966) with Eva Marie Saint and Toshiro Mifune, directed by John Frankenheimer and co-produced through Garner's own film production company Cherokee Productions, left Garner with a fascination for car racing that he often explored by actually racing during the ensuing years. The expensive Cinerama epic by MGM did not fare as well as expected at the box office and, together with the poor performance of his last six films, he was blamed for the movie not doing better, which damaged Garner's theatrical film career.

In 1969, despite opposition from some at MGM and having to plead his case, Garner played Raymond Chandler's Philip Marlowe in Marlowe, a detective drama featuring an early extended kung fu scene with the great martial artist and actor Bruce Lee. The same year, Garner scored a hit with the comedy Western Support Your Local Sheriff! with Walter Brennan and Jack Elam.

1970s

Nichols (1971–1972)

In 1971, Garner returned to television in an offbeat series, Nichols, in which his character was killed and replaced by a more colorless twin brother at the end of the series. In one explanation for the unusual denouement, the recast as the character's somewhat more normal twin brother would have hopefully created a more popular series with few cast changes. However, according to Garner's 1999 videotaped Archive of American Television interview, Garner killed his character because they had already cancelled the show and played his own twin because they had to finish the episode.

Feature films
Also in 1971 he starred in Support Your Local Gunfighter! (similar to the western spoof Support Your Local Sheriff!), while in the frontier comedy Skin Game, Garner and Louis Gossett Jr. starred as con men pretending to be an owner and his slave during the pre-Civil War era. The following year, Garner played a small town sheriff investigating a murder in They Only Kill Their Masters with Katharine Ross. He appeared in two Disney films also starring Vera Miles as his leading lady, One Little Indian (1973), featuring Jodie Foster in an early minor role, and The Castaway Cowboy (1974) with Robert Culp.

The Rockford Files (1974–1980)

In the 1970s, Roy Huggins had an idea to remake Maverick, but this time as a modern-day private detective. Huggins worked with co-creator Stephen J. Cannell, and the pair selected Garner to attempt to rekindle the success of Maverick, eventually recycling many of the plots from the original series, according to both Huggins' and Cannell's Archive of American Television interviews. Starting with the 1974 season, Garner appeared as private investigator Jim Rockford in The Rockford Files. He appeared for six seasons, for which he received an Emmy Award for Best Actor in 1977. In the 2016 book titled TV (The Book), film and television critic Matt Zoller Seitz stated that the series gave Garner "the role he was put on earth to play." Veteran character actor Noah Beery Jr., nephew of screen legend Wallace Beery, played Rockford's father "Rocky" in numerous episodes.

Between 1978 and 1985, Garner co-starred with Mariette Hartley, who had made an Emmy-nominated appearance on The Rockford Files, in 250 TV commercials for Polaroid, a manufacturer of instant film and cameras. They portrayed a bantering, bickering couple so convincingly that some viewers believed that the two were married. After six seasons, The Rockford Files was cancelled in 1980. The physical toll on Garner resulted in his doctor ordering him to take some time off to rest. Appearing in nearly every scene of the series, doing many of his own stunts—including one that injured his back—was wearing him out. A knee injury from his National Guard days worsened in the wake of the continuous jumping and rolling, and he was hospitalized with a bleeding ulcer in 1979. When Garner's physician ordered him to rest, the studio immediately cancelled The Rockford Files.

Stuart Margolin (who played Angel Martin in The Rockford Files) said that despite Garner's health problems in the later years of The Rockford Files, he would often work long shifts, unusual for a starring actor, staying to do off-camera lines with other actors, doing his own stunts despite his knee problems. When Garner later made The Rockford Files television movies, he said that 22 people (with the exception of series co-star Beery, who died late in 1994) came out of retirement to participate.

In July 1983, Garner filed suit against Universal Studios for US$16.5 million in connection with his ongoing dispute from The Rockford Files. The suit charged Universal with "breach of contract; failure to deal in good faith and fairly; and fraud and deceit". Garner alleged that Universal was "creatively accounting", two words that are now part of the Hollywood lexicon. The suit was eventually settled out of court in 1989. As part of the agreement, Garner could not disclose the amount of the settlement.

"The industry is like it always has been. It's a bunch of greedy people," he stated in 1990. Garner sued Universal again in 1998 for $2.2 million over syndication royalties. In this suit, he charged the studio with "deceiving him and suppressing information about syndication". He was supposed to receive $25,000 per episode that ran in syndication, but Universal charged him "distribution fees". He also felt that the studio did not release the show to the highest bidder for the episode reruns.

The New Maverick (1978)
Garner and Jack Kelly reappeared as Bret and Bart Maverick in a 1978 made-for-television film titled The New Maverick written by Juanita Bartlett, directed by Hy Averback, and also starring Susan Sullivan as Poker Alice. As had often been the case in episodes of the original series, Bret's brother Bart shows up only briefly toward the end.

The New Maverick served as the pilot for a failed television series, Young Maverick, featuring the adventures of Bret and Bart's younger cousin Ben Maverick, portrayed in both The New Maverick and Young Maverick by Charles Frank. The series itself, which only presented Garner for a few moments at the beginning of the first show, was canceled so rapidly that some of the episodes filmed were never broadcast in the United States. Despite the title, Frank was three years older than Garner had been at the launch of the original series.

1980s

Bret Maverick (1981–1982)
After the abrupt disappearance of Young Maverick two seasons earlier, an attempt to make a "Maverick" series without Garner, he returned to his earlier TV role in 1981 in the revival series Bret Maverick, but NBC unexpectedly canceled the show after only one season despite reasonably good ratings. Critics noted that the scripts did not measure up to the episodes starring Garner in the first series. Jack Kelly (Bart Maverick) was slated to become a series regular had the show been picked up for another season. Kelly was presented with a stack of finished scripts featuring Bart Maverick for the upcoming second season, and he appeared in the last scene of the final episode in a surprise guest appearance.

TV movies
During the 1980s, Garner played dramatic roles in a number of television films, including Heartsounds with Mary Tyler Moore featuring the true story of a doctor (played by Garner) who is deprived of oxygen for too long during an operation and wakes up mentally impaired; Promise with James Woods and Piper Laurie, about dealing with a mentally ill adult sibling; and My Name Is Bill W. with James Woods, in which Garner portrays the founder of Alcoholics Anonymous. In 1984, he played the lead in Joseph Wambaugh's The Glitter Dome for HBO Pictures, which was directed by his Rockford Files co-star Stuart Margolin. The film generated a mild controversy for a bondage sequence featuring Garner and co-star Margot Kidder.
In 1984 he also starred in the movie Tank, about a soon-to-be retiring US Army Command Sergeant Major named Zack Carey who butted heads with a corrupt local sheriff after an incident with one of his deputies off base and used a privately owned Sherman Tank to exact justice.

Murphy's Romance (1985)
Garner's only Oscar nomination was for Best Actor in a Leading Role for the film Murphy's Romance (1985), opposite Sally Field. Field and director Martin Ritt had to fight the studio, Columbia Pictures, to have Garner cast, since he was regarded as a TV actor by then despite having co-starred in the box office hit Victor/Victoria opposite Julie Andrews two years earlier. Columbia did not want to make the movie, because it had no "sex or violence" in it. But because of the success of Norma Rae (1979), with the same star (Field), director, and screenplay writing team (Harriet Frank Jr. and Irving Ravetch), and with Field's new production company (Fogwood Films) producing, Columbia agreed. Columbia wanted Marlon Brando to play the part of Murphy, so Field and Ritt had to insist on Garner. Part of the deal from the studio, which at that time was owned by The Coca-Cola Company, included an eight-line sequence of Field and Garner saying the word "Coke," and also having Coke signs appear prominently in the film. In A&E's Biography of Garner, Field reported that her on-screen kiss with Garner was the best cinematic kiss she had ever experienced.

Sunset (1988)
Garner played Wyatt Earp (whom he physically resembled) in two very different movies shot 21 years apart, John Sturges' Hour of the Gun in 1967 and Blake Edwards' Sunset in 1988. The first film was a realistic depiction of the O.K. Corral shootout and its aftermath, while the second centered around a comedic fictional adventure shared by Earp and silent movie cowboy star Tom Mix. Earp had actually worked as a consultant for Western films during the silent film era toward the end of his life. The movie features Bruce Willis as Mix in only his second movie role. Although Willis was billed over Garner, the film actually gave more screen time and emphasis to Earp.

For the second half of the 1980s, Garner also appeared in several of the North American market Mazda television commercials as an on-screen spokesman.

1990s

In 1991, Garner starred in Man of the People, a television series about a con man chosen to fill an empty seat on a city council, with Kate Mulgrew and Corinne Bohrer. Despite reasonably fair ratings, the show was canceled after only 10 episodes.

In 1993, Garner played the lead in a well-received HBO movie, the true story Barbarians at the Gate, and went on to reprise his role as Jim Rockford in eight The Rockford Files made-for-TV movies beginning the following year. Practically everyone in the original cast of recurring characters returned for the new episodes except Noah Beery Jr., who had died in the interim. According to Garner's memoir The Garner Files, he insisted upon being fully paid in cash before the shooting began on each of the Rockford TV-movies.

In 1994, Garner played Marshal Zane Cooper in a movie version of Maverick, with Mel Gibson as Bret Maverick (in the end it is revealed that Garner's character is the father of Gibson's Maverick) and Jodie Foster as a gambling lass with a fake Southern accent.

In 1995, he played lead character Woodrow Call, an ex-lawman, in the TV miniseries sequel to Lonesome Dove entitled Streets of Laredo, based on Larry McMurtry's novel. In 1996, Garner and Jack Lemmon teamed up in My Fellow Americans, playing two former presidents who uncover scandalous activity by their successor (Dan Aykroyd) and are pursued by murderous NSA agents. In addition to a major recurring role during the last part of the run of TV series Chicago Hope, Garner also starred in two short-lived series, the animated God, the Devil and Bob and First Monday, in which he played a fictional version of the Supreme Court's Chief Justice of the United States.

2000s and 2010s

In 2000, after an operation to replace both knees, Garner appeared with Clint Eastwood, who had played a villain in the original Maverick series in the episode "Duel at Sundown," as astronauts in the movie Space Cowboys, also featuring Tommy Lee Jones and Donald Sutherland.

In 2001, Garner voiced Commander Rourke in Atlantis: The Lost Empire. In 2002, following the death of James Coburn, Garner took over Coburn's role as TV commercial voiceover for Chevrolet's "Like a Rock" advertising campaign. Garner continued to voice the commercials until the end of the campaign. Also in 2002, he played Sandra Bullock's father in Divine Secrets of the Ya-Ya Sisterhood as Shepard James "Shep" Walker. After the death of John Ritter in 2003, Garner joined the cast of 8 Simple Rules as Grandpa Jim Egan (Cate's father) and remained with the series until it finished in 2005.

In 2004, Garner starred as the older version of Ryan Gosling's character in the film version of Nicholas Sparks's The Notebook alongside Gena Rowlands as his wife, directed by Nick Cassavetes, Rowlands's son. The Screen Actors Guild nominated Garner as best actor for "Outstanding Performance by a Male Actor in a Supporting Role". In 2006, Garner made his last personal appearance in the film The Ultimate Gift as billionaire Howard "Red" Stevens.  In 2010, Garner voiced Shazam in Superman/Shazam!: The Return of Black Adam.

Memoir

On November 1, 2011, Simon & Schuster published Garner's autobiography The Garner Files: A Memoir. In addition to recounting his career, the memoir, co-written with nonfiction writer Jon Winokur, detailed the childhood abuses Garner suffered at the hands of his stepmother. It also offered frank, unflattering assessments of some of Garner's co-stars such as Steve McQueen and Charles Bronson. In addition to recalling the genesis of most of Garner's hit films and television shows, the book also featured a section where the star provided individual critiques for every one of his acting projects accompanied by a star rating for each. Garner's three-time co-star Julie Andrews wrote the book's foreword. Lauren Bacall, Diahann Carroll, Doris Day, Tom Selleck, Stephen J. Cannell, and many other Garner associates, friends, and relatives provided their memories of the star in the book's coda.

The "most explosive revelation" in his autobiography was that Garner smoked marijuana for much of his adult life. "I started smoking it in my late teens," Garner wrote.

Awards and nominations

Nominated for 15 Emmy Awards during his television career, Garner received the award in 1977 as Outstanding Lead Actor in a Drama Series (The Rockford Files) and in 1987 as executive producer of Promise.

For his contribution to the film and television industry, Garner received a star on the Hollywood Walk of Fame (at 6927 Hollywood Boulevard).

In 1990, he was inducted into the Western Performers Hall of Fame at the National Cowboy & Western Heritage Museum in Oklahoma City, Oklahoma. He was also inducted into the Television Hall of Fame that same year. In February 2005, he received the Screen Actors Guild's Lifetime Achievement Award. He was also nominated for Outstanding Performance by a Male Actor in a Supporting Role that year, for The Notebook. When Morgan Freeman won that prize for his work in Million Dollar Baby, Freeman led the audience in a sing-along of the original Maverick theme song, written by David Buttolph and Paul Francis Webster.

In 2010, the Television Critics Association gave Garner its annual Career Achievement Award.

Statue

On April 21, 2006, a  bronze statue of Garner as Bret Maverick was unveiled in Garner's hometown of Norman, Oklahoma, with Garner present at the ceremony.

Personal life

Marriage and family

Garner was married to Lois Josephine Fleischman Clarke, whom he met at a party in 1956. They married 14 days later on August 17, 1956. "We went to dinner every night for 14 nights. I was just absolutely nuts about her. I spent $77 on our honeymoon, and it about broke me." According to Garner, "Marriage is like the Army; everyone complains, but you'd be surprised at the large number of people who re-enlist." His wife practiced Judaism.

When Garner and Clarke married, her daughter Kim from a previous marriage was seven years old and recovering from polio. Garner had one daughter with Lois, Greta "Gigi" Garner who was born on January 4, 1958. In an interview in Good Housekeeping with Garner, his wife, and two daughters, conducted at their home and published in March 1976, Gigi's age was given as 18 and Kim's as 27.

Garner and his wife Lois remained married until Garner's death in 2014. They had two separations, the first for three months in 1970, and nine years later they again lived apart for a time, reuniting in September 1981. Garner stated that during this second period apart he split his time between Canada and "a rented house in the Valley." In each case Garner said the separations were caused by the stress of his acting career, and were not due to marital problems. In the case of The Rockford Files he was in almost every scene, in constant pain due to his arthritic knees, and was under tremendous stress from the studio. He stated when he quit the series in 1979 he simply needed to spend time alone in order to recover from the stress. Garner's death in 2014 was less than a month before their 58th wedding anniversary. His wife died seven years later, on October 30, 2021.

Health problems
Garner's knees became a chronic problem during the filming of The Rockford Files in the 1970s, with "six or seven knee operations during that time." In 2000, he underwent knee replacement surgery for both knees.

On April 22, 1988, Garner had quintuple bypass heart surgery. Though he recovered rapidly, he was advised to stop smoking. Garner quit smoking 17 years later.

Garner underwent surgery on May 11, 2008, following a severe stroke he had suffered two days earlier. His prognosis was reported to be "very positive".

Racing
Garner had an interest in auto racing since his youth, but his interest was magnified during preparations for the filming of Grand Prix. John Frankenheimer, the director and impetus behind the project, was determined to make the film as realistic as possible. He was trying to determine which actor he could focus on for high speed takes. At his disposal were the services of Bob Bondurant, a Formula 1 racer who was serving as technical consultant for the film. The first step was to place the actors in a two-seater version of a Formula 1 car to see how they would handle the high speeds. Bondurant noted all the actors became quite frightened over 240 kph, all except Garner, who returned to the pit laughing like an excited child. Said Bondurant, "This is your man". From there on out, all the actors were placed in a race driver training program except for Garner, whom Bonderant was assigned to personally train up. Garner proved to be a good student, a hard worker and a talented driver. Compared to the other actors in the movie, Bondurant tagged Garner as being 'light years' ahead. By the end of the film Bonderant asserted Garner could compete on a Formula 1 team, and would best some of the drivers currently in the field.

Following the completion of Grand Prix, Garner become involved in auto racing. From 1967 through 1969 Garner was an owner of the "American International Racers" (AIR) auto racing team. Motorsports writer William Edgar and Hollywood director Andy Sidaris teamed with Garner for the racing documentary The Racing Scene, filmed in 1969 and released in 1970. The team fielded cars at the Le Mans, Daytona, and Sebring endurance races, but is best known for raising public awareness in early off-road motor-sports events, many of which Garner competed in. In 1978, he was one of the inaugural inductees in the Off-Road Motorsports Hall of Fame.

Garner signed a three-year sponsorship contract with American Motors Corporation (AMC). His shops prepared ten 1969 SC/Ramblers for the Baja 500 race. Garner did not drive in this event because of a film commitment in Spain that year. Nevertheless, seven of his cars finished the grueling race, taking three of the top five places in the sedan class. Garner also drove the pace car at the Indianapolis 500 race in 1975, 1977, and 1985 (see: list of Indianapolis 500 pace cars).

In 1987 Garner announced plans to partner with Larry Cahill to form a racing team to compete in the 1988 Indycar season. The intention was to base the team in Cedar Rapids, Iowa, where Cahill operated his businesses. The estimated budget was $3.5 million. Plans for this team never came to fruition.
Cahill later formed his own team to compete in the Indy Racing League.

Golf
Garner was an avid golfer for many years. Along with his brother, Jack, he played golf in high school. Jack even attempted a professional golfing career after a brief stint in the Pittsburgh Pirates baseball farm system. Garner took it up again in the late 1950s to see if he could beat Jack. He was a regular for years at the Pebble Beach Pro-Am. In February 1990 at the AT&T Golf Tournament, he won the Most Valuable Amateur Trophy. Garner appeared on Sam Snead's Celebrity Golf TV series which aired from 1960 – 1963. These matches were 9-hole charity events pitting Snead against Hollywood celebrities.

American football
Garner was noted as an enthusiastic fan of the Raiders in the NFL; he regularly attended games and mixed with the players. He was also present when the Raiders won Super Bowl XVIII over the Washington Redskins in January 1984 at Tampa, Florida.

University of Oklahoma
Garner was a supporter of the University of Oklahoma, often returning to Norman for school functions. When he attended Oklahoma Sooners football games, he frequently could be seen on the sidelines or in the press box. Garner received an honorary Doctor of Humane Letters degree at OU in 1995.

In 2003, to endow the James Garner Chair in the School of Drama, he donated $500,000, half of a pledged $1 million, for the first endowed position at the drama school.

Politics

Garner was a strong Democratic Party supporter. From 1982, Garner gave at least $29,000 to Federal campaigns, of which over $24,000 was to Democratic Party candidates, including Dennis Kucinich (for Congress in 2002), Dick Gephardt, John Kerry, Barbara Boxer, and various Democratic committees and groups.

On August 28, 1963, Garner was one of several celebrities to join Martin Luther King Jr. in the "March on Washington for Jobs and Freedom." In his autobiography, Garner recalled sitting in the third row listening to King's "I Have a Dream" speech.

For his role in the 1985 CBS miniseries Space, the character's party affiliation was changed from Republican as in the book to reflect Garner's personal views. Garner said, "My wife would leave me if I played a Republican."

There was an effort by California Democratic party leaders, led by state Senator Herschel Rosenthal, to persuade Garner to seek the Democratic nomination for Governor of California in the 1990 election. However, future United States Senator and former San Francisco Mayor Dianne Feinstein received the nomination instead, losing to Republican Pete Wilson in the election.

Friendship with Richmond Barthé
Garner became a friend, supporter and main benefactor of African-American sculptor Richmond Barthé, from the time the latter returned from Europe in 1977 and settled in Pasadena, until Barthé's death in 1989.

Death

Garner was a private and introverted man, according to family and friends. On July 19, 2014, police and rescue personnel were summoned to Garner's Brentwood, Los Angeles home, where they found the actor dead at the age of 86. He had a heart attack caused by coronary artery disease. He had been in poor health since his stroke in 2008.

Longtime friends Tom Selleck (who worked with Garner on The Rockford Files), Sally Field (who starred with Garner in Murphy's Romance) and Clint Eastwood (who guest-starred with Garner on Maverick and starred in Space Cowboys) reflected on his death. Selleck said, "Jim was a mentor to me and a friend, and I will miss him." Field said, "My heart just broke. There are few people on this planet I have adored as much as Jimmy Garner. I cherish every moment I spent with him and relive them over and over in my head. He was a diamond." Eastwood said, "Garner opened the door for people like Steve McQueen and myself."

Filmography

See also

Karl L. Rundberg, a Los Angeles City Council member who engaged in a public quarrel with Garner at a council meeting

References

Notes

Bibliography

 Photos of the shooting The Great Escape.

External links

James Garner at the Museum of Broadcast Communications

Gigi & James Garner Page on Twitter
James Garner Animal Rescue Fund

1928 births
2014 deaths
20th-century American male actors
21st-century American male actors
American male film actors
American male television actors
Methodists from Colorado
American people of German descent
American shooting survivors
Best Miniseries or Television Movie Actor Golden Globe winners
California Democrats
California National Guard personnel
Deaths from coronary artery disease
Hollywood High School alumni
Male actors from California
Male actors from Los Angeles
Male actors from Oklahoma
Male Western (genre) film actors
Military personnel from California
Military personnel from Oklahoma
New Star of the Year (Actor) Golden Globe winners
Oklahoma Democrats
Outstanding Performance by a Lead Actor in a Drama Series Primetime Emmy Award winners
People from Norman, Oklahoma
Television personalities from California
Television producers from California
United States Army non-commissioned officers
United States Army personnel of the Korean War
United States Merchant Mariners
United States Merchant Mariners of World War II
University of Oklahoma alumni
Warner Bros. contract players
Western (genre) television actors